2015 Homeland Union – Lithuanian Christian Democrats leadership election determined the leader of the Homeland Union – Lithuanian Christian Democrats, who will stand as candidate for the office of Prime Minister in the subsequent parliamentary election, which took place on 9 October 2016 and 23 October 2016.

Candidates

Andrius Kubilius, which had led the party since 2003, in March 2015 (after municipal councils elections) announced that he will not stand for leadership election.

Declared

Withdrawn 
These candidates announced their withdrawal:
 Agnė Bilotaitė, Member of the Seimas (2008–present)
 Kazys Starkevičius, Member of the Seimas (2004–present), Minister of Agriculture (2008–2012)
 Vytautas Juozapaitis, soloist, Member of the Seimas (2012–present)

Results
Gabrielius Landsbergis became party's leader and led party to the Seimas elections of 2016, in which the party achieved its best result since 1996.

References

2015 elections in Europe
Elections in Lithuania
2015 in Lithuania